The New Explorers was a documentary television program on PBS produced in the 1990s that was hosted by Bill Kurtis.

Awards
The series won the Bronze Wrangler at the Western Heritage Awards in 1999 for an episode "The New Explorers: Betrayal At Little Big Horn".
The series won a Peabody Award in 1993.

References

PBS original programming